Arrows is the second album by English singer-songwriter Polly Scattergood, released in the United Kingdom on 22 October 2013 by Mute Records.

Track listing
All songs written by Glenn Kerrigan, Polly Scattergood unless noted.

 "Cocoon" (Polly Scattergood)
 "Falling"
 "Machines"
 "Disco Damaged Kid"
 "Colours Colliding"
 "Miss You"
 "Subsequently Lost"
 "Silver Lining"
 "Wanderlust"
 "I've Got A Heart (Polly Scattergood)"

References

2013 albums
Polly Scattergood albums
Mute Records albums